Constableville is a village in Lewis County, New York, United States. The population was 242 at the 2010 census. The village is named after William Constable, the son of an early landowner.

The village is within the town of West Turin and is north of Rome.

History 
The village is the site of the first settlement in the town of West Turin, taking place circa  1796. 

The Constableville Village Historic District, Jonathan C. Collins House and Cemetery, and Constable Hall are listed on the National Register of Historic Places. Constable Hall, a restored 19th century mansion with original furnishings, was built out of limestone.

Geography
Constableville is located in the eastern part of the town of West Turin at  (43.564642, -75.425883). The Sugar River, a tributary of the Black River, runs through the village.

Constableville is on New York State Route 26, which leads north  to Lowville, the county seat, and south  to Rome.

Adjacent communities 
Constableville is northeast of Mohawk Hill, southwest of Collinsville, and west of Locust Grove.

Demographics

As of the census of 2000, there were 305 people, 125 households, and 79 families residing in the village. The population density was 272.4 people per square mile (105.1/km2). There were 154 housing units at an average density of 137.6 per square mile (53.1/km2). The racial makeup of the village was 100.00% White. Hispanic or Latino of any race were 0.33% of the population.

There were 125 households, out of which 27.2% had children under the age of 18 living with them, 41.6% were married couples living together, 14.4% had a female householder with no husband present, and 36.8% were non-families. 32.0% of all households were made up of individuals, and 17.6% had someone living alone who was 65 years of age or older. The average household size was 2.44 and the average family size was 3.04.

In the village, the population was spread out, with 26.2% under the age of 18, 7.9% from 18 to 24, 28.2% from 25 to 44, 22.0% from 45 to 64, and 15.7% who were 65 years of age or older. The median age was 37 years. For every 100 females, there were 94.3 males. For every 100 females age 18 and over, there were 86.0 males.

The median income for a household in the village was $43,125, and the median income for a family was $47,083. Males had a median income of $48,438 versus $23,750 for females. The per capita income for the village was $16,140. About 11.8% of families and 16.5% of the population were below the poverty line, including 18.9% of those under the age of eighteen and 23.8% of those 65 or over.

Today
Today Constableville is home to 240 plus residents, a gas station/grocery store, a diner, 2 restaurant and bars (The Alpine and Whiskey Jacks), a winery (Roads End Orchards), an antique store, 2 Churches, a Volunteer Fire and Ambulance Department. The village hosts flywheels and pulleys and the C-Ville Fire Department field days yearly

References

External links
  Constable Hall

Villages in New York (state)
Populated places established in 1796
Villages in Lewis County, New York
1796 establishments in New York (state)